Rod Loomis (born April 21, 1942, in St. Albans, Vermont) is an American actor. Loomis is best known for his role in Bill & Ted's Excellent Adventure as Sigmund Freud.

He was also in the 1973 Off-Broadway revival of You Never Know and the 1995 tour of Jekyll & Hyde as Sir Danvers Carew.

Filmography

References

External links

Living people
People from Franklin County, Vermont
American male film actors
1942 births
American male stage actors
People from St. Albans, Vermont
American male television actors
American male soap opera actors
Male actors from Vermont